"I Need Your Love" is a song by the American rock band Boston, released on their 1994 album Walk On. Written by guitarist Tom Scholz and Fred Sampson, it was the lead single from Walk On, and the first single by the group to feature Fran Cosmo on lead vocals.

"I Need Your Love" peaked at No. 51 on the Billboard Hot 100 and, to date, is the last song by the band to make an appearance on that chart.

Track listing
"I Need Your Love" - 4:05
"We Can Make It" - 5:24
"The Launch" - 2:49

Charts

References

1994 singles
Boston (band) songs
Songs written by Tom Scholz
Song recordings produced by Tom Scholz
MCA Records singles
1994 songs